Amtkeli is a small river in north-western Georgia. It originates in the Caucasus Mountains, in the region of Upper Abkhazia, in the western part of the Chkhalta range near Amtkeli pass. It flows south to Lake Amtkeli and joins the Kodori River.

The Amtkeli is fed by snow, rain and groundwater. Floods occur in late spring and summer, and the low flows occur in winter.

References 

Rivers of Georgia (country)
Rivers of Abkhazia
Tributaries of the Kodori